"Berzerk" is a song by American rapper Eminem. The song, released on August 27, 2013, is the first single from Eminem's eighth studio album The Marshall Mathers LP 2. The song was produced by Rick Rubin and samples Billy Squier's "The Stroke", as well as the Beastie Boys' "Fight for Your Right", taken from their 1986 debut album Licensed to Ill, which Rubin had also produced, and Naughty by Nature's "Feel Me Flow". The song was heavily downloaded in its first week of release, resulting in the song debuting at number three on the US Billboard Hot 100.

Composition

The song, produced by Rick Rubin, samples Billy Squier's "The Stroke", the Beastie Boys' "Fight for Your Right", taken from their 1986 debut album Licensed to Ill and also produced by Rubin, and Naughty by Nature's "Feel Me Flow". Writing credits are given to Eminem, Rubin, Squier, Adam Yauch and Adam Horovitz of the Beastie Boys, and Anthony Criss, Vincent Brown, and Kier Gist of Naughty by Nature, Ziggy Modeliste, Art Neville, Cyril Neville, Leo Nocentelli and George Porter Jr. for the "Feel Me Flow" segment.

The song starts with a "blast of static, hard guitar and Em roaring out of the gate sounding like the long-lost, fourth Beastie Boy", according to Yahoo! Music critic Craig Rosen. The song samples the "Kick it!" part of "(You Gotta) Fight for Your Right (To Party!)", performed by Ad-Rock. According to Billboard Lars Brandle, the song is "a punchy, guitar-and-beats driven song which channels Joan Jett & the Blackhearts' I Love Rock 'n' Roll and Licensed to Ill-era Beastie Boys."

Music video 
During the halftime at the September 7, 2013 Michigan–Notre Dame football game, Eminem premiered a preview of the music video for "Berzerk". Then the video was premiered two days later on September 9, via VEVO. The video was filmed in Brooklyn, New York and directed by Syndrome. It features cameo appearances from fellow American rappers Kendrick Lamar and Kid Rock (both of whom Eminem mentions in the song's lyrics) in addition to Shady Records labelmates Slaughterhouse, Mr. Porter, Yelawolf and The Alchemist, the song's producer Rick Rubin and Eminem's manager Paul Rosenberg. The video also features short clips of backyard wrestling, and public fights as well as short clips of the official music video of Billy Squier's "The Stroke", which is heavily sampled in the song. The video received a nomination at MTV Video Music Awards 2014 in the category "Best Hip-Hop Video".

Release and promotion
"Berzerk" originally premiered on August 26, on SiriusXM channel, Shade 45. The Marshall Mathers LP 2, a sequel to Eminem's acclaimed studio effort The Marshall Mathers LP, was revealed during MTV Video Music Awards on August 25, 2013 with two previews of "Berzerk" via Beats By Dr. Dre commercials. Some critics describe Eminem's return in these commercials as the highlight of the show. The video that accompanied the song featured a boombox prominently. The song was the featured song for the 2013 season of Saturday Night Football, debuting with the September 7 Michigan–Notre Dame football rivalry game. On 10 November 2013 in Amsterdam for the MTV Europe Music Awards 2013, he performed "Berzerk" and also "Rap God".

Commercial performance
"Berzerk" sold 362,000 downloads in its first week in the US, debuting at number three on the Billboard Hot 100 (behind Katy Perry's Roar and Robin Thicke's Blurred Lines) becoming Eminem's 15th Top 10 hit on the Hot 100. The song has peaked at number two on the Hot R&B/Hip-Hop Songs chart. When the R&B component of the chart is removed, the song debuted at number one on the Rap Songs chart. "Berzerk"'s debut is just below the debut of the lead single for Recovery, "Not Afraid", which sold 379,000 copies in its first week. It has sold over a million copies in the US as of October 2013.

In Canada, the song debuted at number two with 50,000 downloads sold, which more than doubled the 24,000 downloads sold in the debut week of "Not Afraid". It was Eminem's best one week download total ever in the country, until it was surpassed by the 54,000 downloads sold for Eminem's later single, "The Monster". The song was certified Double Platinum in Digital downloads in Canada on November 1, 2013.

The song debuted at number one on the UK R&B Chart and was replaced on the chart by his single "Rap God".

Critical reception
Will Hermes of Rolling Stone gave the song 4 out of 5 stars, highlighting its goal to "celebrate old-school hip-hop". Robert Copsey of Digital Spy gave the song 4 out of 5 stars, stating the song "harks back" to Eminem's "Slim Shady days". Copsey compared the song to Beastie Boys circa 1986, although the song as "inimitable" and "unmistakably Eminem". VH1 India gave the song 8/10 concluding, "Whether you shudder under 'Berzerk's' cacophonous assault or wear its raps like an emblem — it's 2013, and Eminem still got your attention."

Awards and nominations

Track listing
Digital download

CD release

Charts

Weekly charts

Year-end charts

Certifications

Radio and release history

References

2013 songs
2013 singles
Eminem songs
Shady Records singles
Aftermath Entertainment singles
Interscope Records singles
Songs written by Eminem
Songs written by Rick Rubin
Song recordings produced by Rick Rubin
Rap rock songs
Songs written by Ad-Rock
Songs written by Adam Yauch
Songs written by Billy Squier
Songs written by Treach
Songs written by Vin Rock
Songs written by KayGee